Vice Admiral Raymond James Griggs,  (born July 1961) is an Australian senior public servant and a former senior officer in the Royal Australian Navy. He served as Chief of Navy from June 2011 to June 2014, before being appointed Vice Chief of the Defence Force until his transfer to the reserve in July 2018.

Following his transfer to the reserves, Griggs held the appointment of the Associate Secretary of the Indigenous Affairs Group within the Department of Prime Minister and Cabinet, and was the inaugural CEO of the National Indigenous Australians Agency. He was appointed Secretary of the Department of Social Services on 22 July 2021.

Early years 
Griggs was born in Homebush, New South Wales, in July 1961 to James and Maureen Griggs.

Naval career 
Griggs joined the Adelaide Port Division of the Royal Australian Navy Reserve in 1978 as a radio operator. He entered the Royal Australian Naval College at HMAS Creswell on a "short service commission" in 1979. In his early years, Griggs served on the aircraft carrier HMAS Melbourne and HMA ships Yarra and Advance. He then spent 12 months with the Royal Navy on HMS Jersey, where he gained his Bridge Watchkeeping Certificate. In late 1981 he was posted to HMAS Perth as a bridge watchkeeper and deployed to the North West Indian Ocean.

Promoted to lieutenant, from 1983 to 1994 Griggs completed a series of postings as navigating officer of HMA Ships Cessnock, Torrens, Tobruk, Jervis Bay and Perth. Other roles included: aide-de-camp to the Governor of Tasmania, Sir James Plimsoll; two postings in the navy's officer career management directorate; staff officer (navigation) to the Commander Australian Patrol Boat Forces; and at Australian Defence Headquarters in Canberra, deputy director military strategy as lieutenant commander, and director future warfare as captain.

From 1995 to 1997 Griggs served as commissioning executive officer of HMAS Anzac, helping to bring the Anzac class frigates into service. In October 2001 he assumed command of the ANZAC class frigate HMAS Arunta and was immediately involved in border protection duties as part of Operation RELEX. Arunta then deployed to the Persian Gulf to enforce United Nations sanctions against Iraq and in support of "The War on Terror". The ship was recognized for her efforts by being awarded the Duke of Gloucester Cup for being the most operationally efficient ship in the RAN fleet for 2002. In 2003 Griggs was posted as the ANZAC class capability element manager in Rockingham, Western Australia. In 2004 he studied at the National War College in Washington, D.C., prior to assuming command of the Australian Amphibious Task Group in mid-2005.

Griggs was promoted to commodore in February 2006 and appointed as the deputy maritime (fleet) commander, until assuming the position of director general navy strategic policy and futures in Navy Headquarters in September 2007. In February 2008 he was seconded to the Defence White Paper team, where he led the development of the force structure review that provided the force structure underpinning the 2009 White Paper. In early 2009 he attended the UK Higher Command and Staff Course and was subsequently promoted to rear admiral and appointed as deputy head strategic reform and governance. In May 2010 he was posted as Deputy Chief of Joint Operations.

Griggs handed over command of the Navy to Vice Admiral Tim Barrett during a ceremony on 30 June 2014, and succeeded Air Marshal Mark Binskin as VCDF that day. After four years in the post and 40 years of service, Griggs retired from the navy on 6 July 2018 and was replaced as VCDF by Vice Admiral David Johnston.

Post military career 
Following his transfer to the reserves, Griggs held the appointment of the Associate Secretary of the Indigenous Affairs Group within the Department of Prime Minister and Cabinet, and was the inaugural CEO of the National Indigenous Australians Agency.

On 9 July 2021, Prime Minister Scott Morrison announced Griggs' appointment as Secretary of the Department of Social Services, with effect from 22 July 2021.

Other activities 
Griggs is an honorary patron of the ACT Veterans Rugby Club.

On 15 January 2020, it was announced that Griggs would be one of the members of the National Co-design Group of the Indigenous voice to government.

Education 
 Bachelor of Arts, University of Queensland
 Master of Business Administration, National Graduate School of Management, Australian National University
 Master of Science (National Security Strategy), National Defense University, Washington D.C.

Personal life 
Griggs is married to Chloe and has a son and a daughter.

Honours and awards 

Griggs was awarded the Conspicuous Service Cross in 1997, a Commendation for Distinguished Service in 2003 for his work in the Persian Gulf, and was appointed a Member of the Order of Australia in 2009.

Griggs was elevated to an Officer of the Order of Australia in the 2012 Queen's Birthday Honours list, "For distinguished service to the Australian Defence Force as Deputy Head Strategic Reform and Governance, Deputy Chief of Joint Operations, and Chief of the Royal Australian Navy."

Griggs has also been awarded the RAN's "Principal Warfare Officer" badge and the RAN's "Sea Readiness Badge" with Gold Star.

References 

|-

|-

|-

1961 births
Australian military personnel of the War in Afghanistan (2001–2021)
Australian National University alumni
Chiefs of Navy (Australia)
Commanders of the Legion of Merit
Graduates of the Royal Australian Naval College
Grand Crosses of Naval Merit
Living people
Officers of the Order of Australia
Officiers of the Légion d'honneur
People from Sydney
Recipients of the Commendation for Distinguished Service
Recipients of the Conspicuous Service Cross (Australia)
Recipients of the Military Civic Action Medal
Recipients of the Pingat Jasa Gemilang (Tentera)
Royal Australian Navy admirals
University of Queensland alumni
Vice Chiefs of the Defence Force (Australia)
Military personnel from New South Wales
Naval War College alumni